Shokolad, Menta, Mastik (translate: Chocolate, mint, gum) was an Israeli female musical trio, active in the 1970s, composed of Yardena Arazi,  and either  (1972-1973) or . All the women served in the IDF as part of the Nahal Ensemble. The trio performed both in Israel and internationally, especially after being the 1976 entry to the Eurovision Song Contest in The Hague with "Emor Shalom". Leah Lupatin later worked with Eurovision winners Milk and Honey, replacing Gali Atari to perform 1979 winning Eurovision entry "Hallelujah" in live concerts, including the 1981 Songs of Europe programme. Lupatin backed Yardena Arazi when she took part in the Eurovision Song Contest 1988.

References

External links

Israeli pop music groups
Musical groups established in 1972
Israeli girl groups
Eurovision Song Contest entrants of 1976
Eurovision Song Contest entrants for Israel
Musical groups disestablished in 1978